Yvonne Pioch (born 15 March 1980) is a German former artistic gymnast. She competed at the 1996 Summer Olympics.

References

1980 births
Living people
German female artistic gymnasts
Gymnasts at the 1996 Summer Olympics
Olympic gymnasts of Germany
People from Neubrandenburg
Sportspeople from Mecklenburg-Western Pomerania
20th-century German women
21st-century German women